Dominic Marquard, Prince of Löwenstein-Wertheim-Rochefort (7 November 1690 – 11 March 1735) was the second Prince of Löwenstein-Wertheim-Rochefort.

He was the sixth son and ninth child of Maximilian Karl Albert, last Count and first Prince of Löwenstein-Wertheim-Rochefort (1656 - 1718), and his wife Countess Maria Polyxena Khuen von Lichtenberg und Belasi (1658 - 1712). He was named after Marquard Sebastian von Schenk von Stauffenberg, (1644–1693) Prince-Bishop of Bamberg, who was his godfather.

On 28 February 1712, he married Landgravine Christine of Hesse-Wanfried (1688 - 1728) a daughter of Charles, Landgrave of Hesse-Wanfried by his second wife Countess Juliane Alexandrine of Leiningen-Dagsburg. Since his older brother had already died, unmarried and without children, at that time he was already Hereditary Prince. Dominic Marquard and Christine had thirteen children, nine of whom survived to adulthood:

 Princess Marie Christine (born and died in 1713)
 Prince Charles Thomas (1714 - 1789) married Princess Maria Charlotte von Holstein-Wiesenburg and had only a daughter Princess Leopoldine of Löwenstein-Wertheim-Rochefort who married her cousin, Charles Albert II, Prince of Hohenlohe-Waldenburg-Schillingsfürst; as widower he married morganatically Maria Josephine von Stipplin
 Prince Johann Philipp Ernst Karl (1715 - 1734) unmarred
 Prince Leopold Constantin (1716 - 1770) unmarried
 Prince Franz Carl Wilhelm Konrad (1717 - 1750) married Baroness Josepha Schirndinger von Schirnding and had one son
 Prince Christian Philipp Josef Alexander (1719 - 1781), married in 1773 Baronesse Franziska d'Humbert without issue
 Prince Johann Joseph Wenzel (1720 - 1788) married Baroness Dorothea von Hausen und Gleichenstorff and had a son
 Princess Sophie Wilhelmine Marie (1721-1749) married Charles Albert I, Prince of Hohenlohe-Waldenburg-Schillingsfürst (1719-1793)
 Prince Theodor Alexander (1722 - 1780) married in 1751 Countess Luise of Leiningen-Dachsburg-Hartenburg, father of Dominic Constantine
 A daughter
 A son
 Princess Maria Leopoldina (1726 - 1759) married Conte Johann Josef Thomas de Giovanni Verclos
 A son

In 1718, he succeeded his father, and acquired various possessions that should influence the history of the House of Löwenstein-Wertheim; in 1720 the Lordship of Haid and its castle in Bohemia, in 1721 the small market town Kleinheubach from the possession of the Counts of Erbach and 1730 the Lordship of Rosenberg in Baden, which derived the Catholic line of the family.

On 17 July 1728, the wife died in childbirth. Dominic died in 1735, in Venice, where he had gone to attend the Carnival in disguise, and was buried there, but his heart was moved to the church of Wertheim.

Sources 
 Martina Heine: Dominik Marquard heiratete Hessin. In: Wertheimer Zeitung vom 28. Februar 2012

1690 births
1738 deaths
People from Wertheim am Main
House of Löwenstein-Wertheim